The Championship Shield is a competition that is played at the end of the regular rugby league season in the Bottom 8 of the Super 8s.

Structure

At the end of the regular season the bottom 8 Championship teams carry points they have earned forward and play each other once more, home or away. After 7 more rounds the bottom two teams are then relegated to League 1 and the top four teams qualify for the play off for the Championship Shield.

Championship Shield Winners

Winners

Venues

Appearances

See also

References

External links

Championship (rugby league)
RFL League 1